The Peralta frog, or montane leopard frog, Lithobates taylori, is a species of frog in the family Ranidae found in Costa Rica and Nicaragua.

Etymology
The specific name taylori honors Edward Harrison Taylor (1889–1978), an American herpetologist.

Description
Peralta frogs are relatively large frogs,  in snout–vent length. Colouration of dorsum is tan, green, or gray, often with large elongated black spots with clear edges. The dorsolateral folds are clear but become discontinuous towards the back. Belly is white. Feet are extensively webbed.

Habitat and conservation
Peralta frog is a nocturnal, semi-aquatic frog inhabiting ponds, swamps, and marshes in lowland wet forest, premontane moist and wet forests, and rainforest. Breeding takes place during the wet season. The eggs are attached to aquatic vegetation. The tadpoles develop in these wetlands. It may be threatened by habitat loss due to deforestation, possibly by also water pollution from agricultural pesticides.

References

Lithobates
Amphibians of Costa Rica
Amphibians of Nicaragua
Amphibians described in 1959
Taxa named by Hobart Muir Smith
Taxonomy articles created by Polbot